The Kaldanes are a fictitious sapient species existing in the region of Bantoom on the planet Barsoom in the John Carter series of books by Edgar Rice Burroughs. Introduced in the book Chessmen of Mars, the Kaldanes are almost all head, but for six arachnoid legs and a pair of chelae. Their racial goal is to achieve pure intellect against bodily existence:

In order to function in the physical realm, the Kaldanes have bred the Rykors: a nonsentient complementary species composed of a body similar to that of a Red Martian but lacking a head; when the Kaldane places itself upon the shoulders of the Rykor, a bundle of tentacles connects with the Rykor's spinal cord, allowing the brain of the Kaldane to control its motor nerves and sensory nerves. Should the Rykor become damaged or die, the Kaldane climbs upon another.

Although the Rykors breed like other animals, the Kaldanes do not breed except for their "king":

The Kaldanes are also imbued with conscious race memory, obtained through selective breeding. They are carnivorous, and sometimes feed upon the Rykors.

In the Wold Newton Universe, the kaldanes are said to be descended from mutated Sarmaks and, which in turn, were possibly descended from Cthulhuoids. In Larry Niven's Rainbow Mars, Kaldanes also appear, although they are called the Tunnel Crabs.

References

Literary characters introduced in 1922
Barsoom
Fictional Martians